The nursing process is a modified scientific method. Nursing practise was first described as a four-stage nursing process by Ida Jean Orlando in 1958. It should not be confused with nursing theories or health informatics. The diagnosis phase was added later.

The nursing process uses clinical judgement to strike a balance of epistemology between personal interpretation and research evidence in which  critical thinking may play a part to categorize the clients issue and course of action. Nursing offers diverse patterns of knowing. Nursing knowledge has embraced pluralism since the 1970s.

Some authors refer to a mind map or abductive reasoning as a potential alternative strategy for organizing care.  Intuition plays a part for experienced nurses.

Phases

The nursing process is goal-oriented method of caring that provides a framework to nursing care. It involves seven major steps:

A
 Assess (what data is collected?)
D
 Diagnose (what is the problem?)
O
  Outcome Identification - (Was originally a part of the Planning phase, but has recently been added as a new step in the complete process).
P
 Plan (how to manage the problem)
I
 Implement (putting plan into action)
R
Rationale (Scientific reason of the implementations)
E
 Evaluate (did the plan work?)

According to some theorists, this seven-steps description of the nursing process is outdated and misrepresents nursing as linear and atomic.

Assessing phase

The nurse completes a holistic nursing assessment of the needs of the individual/family/community, regardless of the reason for the encounter. The nurse collects subjective data and objective data using a nursing framework, such as Marjory  Gordon's functional health patterns.

Models for data collection
Nursing assessments provide the starting point for determining nursing diagnoses. It is vital that a recognized nursing assessment framework is used in practice to identify the patient's* problems, risks and outcomes for enhancing health. The use of an evidence-based nursing framework such as Gordon's Functional Health Pattern Assessment should guide assessments that support nurses in determination of NANDA-I nursing diagnoses. For accurate determination of nursing diagnoses, a useful, evidence-based assessment framework is best practice.

Methods
Client Interview
Physical Examination
Obtaining a health history (including dietary data)
Family history/report

Diagnosing phase

Nursing diagnoses represent the nurse's clinical judgment about actual or potential health problems/life process occurring with the individual, family, group or community. The accuracy of the nursing diagnosis is validated when a nurse is able to clearly identify and link to the defining characteristics, related factors and/or risk factors found within the patients assessment. Multiple nursing diagnoses may be made for one client.

Planning phase

In agreement with the client, the nurse addresses each of the problems identified in the diagnosing phase. When there are multiple nursing diagnoses to be addressed, the nurse prioritizes which diagnoses will receive the most attention first according to their severity and potential for causing more serious harm. The most common terminology for standardized nursing diagnosis is that of the evidence-based terminology developed and refined by NANDA International, the oldest and one of the most researched of all standardized nursing languages. For each problem a measurable goal/outcome is set. For each goal/outcome, the nurse selects nursing interventions that will help achieve the goal/outcome, which are aimed at the related factors (etiologies) not merely at symptoms (defining characteristics). A common method of formulating the expected outcomes is to use the evidence-based Nursing Outcomes Classification to allow for the use of standardized language which improves consistency of terminology, definition and outcome measures.  The interventions used in the Nursing Interventions Classification again allow for the use of standardized language which improves consistency of terminology, definition and ability to identify nursing activities, which can also be linked to nursing workload and staffing indices. The result of this phase is a nursing care plan.

Implementing phase
The nurse implements the nursing care plan, performing the determined interventions that were selected to help meet the goals/outcomes that were established. Delegated tasks and the monitoring of them is included here as well.

Activities
 pre-assessment of the client-done before just carrying out implementation to determine if it is relevant
 determine need for assistance
 implementation of nursing orders
 delegating and supervising-determines who to carry out what action

Evaluating phase
The nurse evaluates the progress toward the goals/outcomes identified in the previous phases. If progress towards the goal is slow, or if regression has occurred, the nurse must change the plan of care accordingly. Conversely, if the goal has been achieved then the care can cease. New problems may be identified at this stage, and thus the process will start all over again.

Characteristics
The nursing process is a cyclical and ongoing process that can end at any stage if the problem is solved. The nursing process exists for every problem that the individual/family/community has. The nursing process not only focuses on ways to improve physical needs, but also on social and emotional needs as well.

The entire process is recorded or documented in order to inform all members of the health care team.

Variations and documentation

The PIE method is a system for documenting actions, especially in the field of nursing.  The name comes from the acronym PIE, meaning Problem, Intervention, Evaluation.

See also

 Clinical Care Classification System
 Decision cycle
 Nursing
 Nursing theory
 Nursing diagnosis
 NANDA
 OODA loop

References

Nursing
Critical thinking
Scientific method